Goniobranchus annulatus is a species of sea slug, a very colourful dorid nudibranch, a shell-less marine gastropod mollusc in the family Chromodorididae.

Description
Goniobranchus annulatus is a large smooth pale-bodied nudibranch with many vivid yellow spots, though these may be absent in some individuals. It has one purple ring around the gills and another ring around the rhinophores. The mantle usually has a purple border. It may grow to 100mm in total length. The gills are triangular in cross-section.

Distribution
This nudibranch was described from Zanzibar. It occurs in the Red Sea, the Indian Ocean, from the East Coast of South Africa to Thailand. It is a Lessepsian migrant and has recently invaded the Mediterranean Sea, presumably through the Suez Canal.

Watch
 Goniobranchus annulatus in the Persian Gulf, Abu-Dhabi, 2008.

References

Chromodorididae
Gastropods described in 1904